The 2014 Sudan Premier League was the 43rd edition of the highest club level football competition in Sudan. 
Al-Merrikh SC are defending champions.

Standings

References

Sudan Premier League seasons
Sudan
Sudan
football